During World War II, the United States Army Air Forces (USAAF) established numerous airfields in Illinois for training pilots and aircrews of USAAF fighters and bombers.

Most of these airfields were under the command of First Air Force or the Army Air Forces Training Command (AAFTC) (A predecessor of the current-day United States Air Force Air Education and Training Command).  However the other USAAF support commands (Air Technical Service Command (ATSC); Air Transport Command (ATC) or Troop Carrier Command) commanded a significant number of airfields in a support roles.

It is still possible to find remnants of these wartime airfields. Many were converted into municipal airports, some were returned to agriculture and several were retained as United States Air Force installations and were front-line bases during the Cold War. Hundreds of the temporary buildings that were used survive today, and are being used for other purposes.

Major Airfields 

Army Air Force Training Command
 Chanute Field AAF, Rantoul
 Eastern Technical Training Center (Metrological School; adv. Specialities)
 9th Army Air Force Base Unit
 Was: Chanute Air Force Base (1917-1993)
 Now: Rantoul National Aviation Center 
 Curtis-Parks AAF, East St. Louis
 Contract Pilot School
 Now: St. Louis Downtown Airport
 George Field AAF, Lawrenceville
 AAF Southeast Training Center
 327th Army Air Force Base Unit
 Now: Lawrenceville-Vincennes International Airport 
 Atterbury AAF, Columbus, Indiana
 Sub-base of George AAF
 Now: Columbus Municipal Airport 
 Sturgis AAF, Sturgis, Kentucky
 Sub-base of George AAF
 Now: Sturgis Municipal Airport 

Air Transport Command
 Scott Field, AAF, Belleville
 8th Army Air Force Base Unit
 Now:  Scott Air Force Base 

Air Technical Service Command
 Chicago MAP, Chicago
 395th Army Air Force Base Unit
 Joint use USAAF/Civil Airport
 Now: the Scottsdale neighborhood  in Chicago, and the southeast side of Burbank, Illinois (see Ashburn Flying Field)
 Orchard Place APT/Douglas AAF, Chicago
 Joint use USAAF/Civil Airport
 Later a joint use USAF/Civil Airport as O'Hare International Airport & O'Hare Air Reserve Station
 Now: O'Hare International Airport

References
 Maurer, Maurer (1983). Air Force Combat Units Of World War II. Maxwell AFB, Alabama: Office of Air Force History. .
 Ravenstein, Charles A. (1984). Air Force Combat Wings Lineage and Honors Histories 1947-1977. Maxwell AFB, Alabama: Office of Air Force History. .
 Thole, Lou (1999), Forgotten Fields of America : World War II Bases and Training, Then and Now - Vol. 2.  Pictorial Histories Pub . 
 Military Airfields in World War II - Illinois

External links

 01
World War II
World War II
World War II
Airfields of the United States Army Air Forces in the United States by state
United States World War II army airfields